Endurance Idahor (4 August 1984 – 6 March 2010) was a  Nigerian professional football player who played for Sudanese club Al-Merreikh. On 6 March 2010, Idahor collapsed during a league game and later died on his way to the hospital.

Career
In 2003, Idahor tied for the Nigeria Premier League scoring title with 12 goals for Julius Berger and moved in 2005 to Dolphins FC. On 23 February 2006, Idahor left Dolphins and moved to Sudanese club Al-Merrikh, he was sent out on loan to Emirati club Al Nasr in January 2008 for 7 months. During his return he became a key player in the first team squad, becoming the top scorer and leading the club to their first CAF Confederation Cup final since 1989. Idahor has also played for the U-23 Nigeria national football team.

He collapsed in a match and died on the way to a hospital.

See also
List of footballers who died while playing

References

External links
 Player Profile

1984 births
2010 deaths
Nigerian footballers
Association football forwards
Expatriate footballers in Sudan
Expatriate footballers in the United Arab Emirates
Association football players who died while playing
Nigerian expatriate sportspeople in Sudan
Bridge F.C. players
Al-Nasr SC (Dubai) players
Dolphin F.C. (Nigeria) players
Nigerian expatriate sportspeople in the United Arab Emirates
Nigeria Professional Football League players
Al-Merrikh SC players
UAE Pro League players
Sport deaths in Sudan
Nigerian expatriate footballers